Ther may refer to:

Thér., taxonomic author abbreviation of Irénée Thériot (1859–1947), French bryologist
Agroha Mound, archaeological site in Agroha, Hisar district, India
Therapy
Therapeutic drugs

See also
Ther Thiruvizha, 1968 Indian Tamil-language drama film
Ther-Rx Company, subsidiary of KV Pharmaceutical